Sorrento is a coastal town on the Mornington Peninsula in Melbourne, Victoria, Australia,  south-west of Melbourne's Central Business District, located within the Shire of Mornington Peninsula local government area. Sorrento recorded a population of 2,013 at the 2021 census.

It is thought that the name 'Sorrento' (after the Italian seaside town) was conferred upon what was known as Sullivans Bay when the area was first opened for housing development in 1869.

History

The Boonwurrung people occupied the area now known as the Mornington Peninsula for tens of thousands of years before the arrival of Europeans. The area now known as Sorrento is traditionally known to the Boonwurrung as Bullanatoolong.

In February 1802, Lieutenant John Murray of  led the first British force to enter Port Phillip Bay. Murray chose to anchor Lady Nelson off what is now known as Sorrento Beach. On 17 February the crew landed ashore and were greeted by about 18 local Boonwurrung. The crew, with their dinners in hand, showed how they ate bread. While one of the crew was handing out bread to everyone, they were ambushed. In response, several Boonwurrung were shot at by musket fire, with three receiving likely mortal wounds. Murray then ordered grapeshot and round shot to be fired from the carronades aboard the ship at the fleeing men. This occurred at a place Murray named Bowen's Point which is now referred to as the Western Sister headland on the Sorrento foreshore. After exploring the southern part of the bay, Murray formally took possession of the area on 8 March 1802 for King George III of Great Britain in a small ceremony at a place now known as the Point King Foreshore Reserve in Sorrento. A few days later Murray sailed out of the heads and returned to Sydney.

In 1803, the British returned and established a convict settlement under the command of Lieutenant Governor David Collins at the Eastern Sister headland of Sullivan Bay in Sorrento. The site became the first British settlement on mainland Australia outside of the Sydney region. Within a few months, the settlement of around 500 people was abandoned and subsequently moved to Hobart in Tasmania. The famous convict, William Buckley, escaped from the Collins Settlement and went on to live with Aboriginal people in the Geelong area for over thirty years.

The Collins Settlement in Sorrento saw the first magistrates' court, public hospital, postal service and government printing office to be established in the region later known as Victoria. The first Victorian wedding, christening and funeral services were also held at the Sullivan Bay site.

Sorrento Post Office opened on 10 January 1871; the heritage-listed Sorrento Post Office building (now used for retail and a cafe) dates from 1904 to 1905.

A horse and steam powered tram which ran between the foreshore and the back beach opened in 1890 and closed in 1920.

The town has a number of grand historic homes and hotels which date back to the 1860s, almost all of which have been constructed with local limestone. The Australia ICOMOS charter for the conservation of places of cultural significance in the practice of local
heritage protection has listed 30 properties. Mechanics' Institute, Sorrento was built in 1877 using local limestone and the building, which is now classified by the National Trust of Australia, houses the Nepean Historical Society's museum. Other notable limestone buildings still standing include: Sorrento Hotel (1872), Anglican Church (1875 nave, 1889 transept), Athenaeum Theatre (1894), Continental Hotel (1875), Whitehall Guest House (1904). The Koonya Hotel and Morgans (both on the foreshore, currently known as Italico restaurant) were built by the Skelton/Clark family (1876). The sandstone Presbyterian Church was built around 1880. Ophir House, opposite the Masonic Lodge, a miniature Whitehall, was replaced by contemporary units.

The Sorrento Park, established in 1870, contains a variety of trees, including an Aleppo Pine grown from a seed of the Lone Pine of Gallipoli. Situated above the beach and overlooking the bay, Sorrento Park has a children's playground, BBQ facilities, and public toilets.

Population

In the 2016 census, there were 1,592 people in Sorrento. 78.0% of people were born in Australia and 86.8% of people spoke only English at home. The most common responses for religion were No Religion 29.0%, Catholic 24.7% and Anglican 19.3%.

Tourist attractions

Charter fishing boats operate from Sorrento Pier. A regular ferry service links Sorrento with Queenscliff in summer.

Sport

The town has an Australian Rules football team, The Sorrento Sharks, competing in the Mornington Peninsula Nepean Football League before winning flags in the PFA in 1929 and 1933, then the MPFL in 1935, 1953, 1964, 1969, 1979, 1980 then the MPNFL in 2004, 2008, 2010, 2011 (seniors and reserves) and 2012. Former St.Kilda footballer Troy Schwarze coached the four grand finals between 2008 and 2011, before Nick Claringbold took over for 2012 so Troy could follow his dream coaching St.Kilda's mid-fielders at their new facility in Seaford and on match days. Troy played with Sorrento in about 9 matches during 2012 when not required in the AFL, and the finals series. Ben McCormack took over the captaincy from Dave Lawson when Dave was appointed coach at Crib Point 3 years ago.

The Sorrento Cricket Club, coached by former Melbourne CC player and mystic guru Nick Davern, also known as "Tin Hat", competes in the Provincial Division of the Mornington Peninsula Cricket Association, having won the Sub-District in 1989/90 and 2002/03, District Division in 2005/2006. It also won senior premierships in the Southern Peninsula Cricket Association (1922-1965) six in succession between 1946/47 and 1951/52, under Bill Clark and Arthur Robertson (3 each), then again in 1955/56 under Jack Mullen and 1957/58 under Derek Minter. Its first and only Provincial First XI premiership was 1971/72 under ex-Northcote and Collingwood player Graham Burt. Forty years on, the seniors had their next opportunity in a Provincial Grand Final losing to rivals Baxter in 2011/12. Season 2012/13 looked promising with the inclusion of ex-Victorian batsman Nick Jewell who scored 3 centuries before the Christmas interval, going on to win the Club Championship with 706 runs and 7 catches, including an opening partnership with Jedd Falck of 205. A second consecutive grand final appearance failed. In 2010/2011 Ryan O'Connor became the first player to win the W. B. Wedgwood medal for Sorrento but it didn't take long for the club to win another with Captain Anthony Blackwell winning in 2011/2012.

The original Macfarlan Reserve pavilion was erected in 1935 with a terraced grandstand upstairs. It was demolished and completely rebuilt in 1984 and re-opened as the Robert (Bob) Keegan pavilion in 1985. Several balconies have been added since. Plans exist to add a gymnasium when funds are available.

The Sorrento Tennis Club originally occupied the land beside the Museum and is a sunken garden today. It was relocated to its current site in the 1960s followed by the Scout Hall and fire track a decade or so later. Netball courts, a skate park and basketball stadium followed creating a single sports complex together with the lawn bowls rinks.

Golfers play at the course of the Sorrento Golf Club on Langford Road.

Sorrento Cemetery

Dame Nellie Melba sang to raise funds for cemetery gates which rusted over time and were taken down and dumped at the tip where they were souvenired and used as a garden ornament. Notable interments include Federal Senator John Button, Member of the Legislative Assembly of Victoria, Vin Heffernan, actor Sophie Heathcote, naturalist Edith Coleman cricketer Shane Warne and Dame Zara Bate, the wife of former Prime Minister of Australia Harold Holt who disappeared at nearby Cheviot Beach.

See also
 Shire of Flinders – Sorrento was previously within this former local government area.

References

External links

 Sorrento – Official state tourism site
 Sorrento Museum and Heritage Gallery
 Watts Cottage
 Sorrento Visitor Guide – Sorrento.com.au

 
Coastal towns in Victoria (Australia)
Suburbs of Melbourne
Suburbs of the Shire of Mornington Peninsula
Ports and harbours of Victoria (Australia)